Saúl Adrián Toloza (born June 5, 1990) is an Argentine footballer who plays for Mitre as a midfielder.

References

External links
Ascenso MX profile

1990 births
Living people
Argentine footballers
Argentine expatriate footballers
Magallanes footballers
Primera B de Chile players
Atlético San Luis footballers
Ascenso MX players
Argentine expatriate sportspeople in Chile
Expatriate footballers in Chile
Argentine expatriate sportspeople in Mexico
Expatriate footballers in Mexico
Association football forwards
Quilmes Atlético Club footballers
El Porvenir footballers
Club Atlético Mitre footballers
Celaya F.C. Premier players
People from Santiago del Estero
Sportspeople from Santiago del Estero Province